The Monterey AVA is an American Viticultural Area located in eastern Monterey County, California. It was established in 1984. It is part of the larger Central Coast AVA. Approximately  of wine grapes are currently cultivated in the Monterey AVA.

The Monterey AVA includes parts of the Carmel Valley and the Salinas Valley, and contains five smaller American Viticultural Areas.  The northern portion is a cool growing region, but one with a very long growing season.  Daytime temperatures rarely exceed  in most parts of the region, although the southern part of the Monterey AVA reaches 100 degrees at times. The soil is sandy and most regions require extensive irrigation from the Salinas River.

Over 50% of the grapes grown in the Monterey AVA are chardonnay. In the northern area, Riesling and Pinot noir are popular, while in the south, Bordeaux varietals are most often grown.

References

External links
Monterey County Vintners and Growers Association
  TTB AVA Map

American Viticultural Areas
American Viticultural Areas of California
Geography of Monterey County, California
Salinas River (California)
Salinas Valley
1984 establishments in California